Li Hao Jian (born 30 October 1956) is a Hong Kong sports shooter. He competed in the men's 25 metre rapid fire pistol event at the 2000 Summer Olympics.

References

External links
 

1956 births
Living people
Hong Kong male sport shooters
Olympic shooters of Hong Kong
Shooters at the 2000 Summer Olympics
Place of birth missing (living people)
Shooters at the 1998 Asian Games
Shooters at the 2002 Asian Games
Shooters at the 2006 Asian Games
Shooters at the 2010 Asian Games
Asian Games competitors for Hong Kong